was a Japanese professional baseball catcher for the Yomiuri Giants and Saitama Seibu Lions of Nippon Professional Baseball.

References

External links

1982 births
Living people
Baseball people from Miyagi Prefecture
Nippon Professional Baseball catchers
Yomiuri Giants players
Saitama Seibu Lions players
Japanese baseball coaches
Nippon Professional Baseball coaches
Japanese expatriate baseball players in Australia
Melbourne Aces players